Beefhide is an unincorporated community spanning across a county line between Letcher County and Pike County, Kentucky, United States.

History
A post office was established at Beefhide in 1901, and remained in operation until 1956. The community takes its name from nearby Beefhide Creek.

Geography
Beefhide is located along Beefhide Creek which runs east and north out of Letcher County, into Pike County.  The post office location per GNIS is in Pike County, Kentucky and the populated place location per GNIS   is in both Letcher County and Pike County ( and ).

References

Unincorporated communities in Letcher County, Kentucky
Unincorporated communities in Pike County, Kentucky
Unincorporated communities in Kentucky
Coal towns in Kentucky